BBC Kids is an Australian pay television channel using the BBC Kids brand, currently exclusive to Telstra's Fetch TV. The channel is aimed at 6 to 10-year-olds and broadcasts comedy, documentaries, drama, entertainment and nature shows that were originally aired on CBBC in the UK.

History 
In 2021, BBC Kids, along with NickMusic, replaced Cartoon Network and Boomerang on 24 April 2021 on Fetch TV, as those latter two services came under an exclusivity agreement with Foxtel and departed the Fetch lineup.

Programming 
The shows broadcast on the channel are as follows:

Current programming 
 Deadly 60 on a Mission
 Horrible Histories 
 Jamie Johnson
 Leonardo
 M.I. High
 Project Parent
 Super Human Challenge
 The Dumping Ground
 The Next Step
 The Sarah Jane Adventures

Upcoming programming 
 Blue Peter

References

External links

Television networks in Australia
International BBC television channels
Television channels and stations established in 2021
English-language television stations in Australia
2021 establishments in Australia
BBC Worldwide